The Kentucky Derby  is a horse race held annually in Louisville, Kentucky, United States, almost always on the first Saturday in May,  capping the two-week-long Kentucky Derby Festival. Colts and geldings carry  and fillies .

It is dubbed "The Run for the Roses", stemming from the blanket of roses draped over the winner. It is also known in the United States as "The Most Exciting Two Minutes in Sports" or "The Fastest Two Minutes in Sports" because of its approximate duration. It is the first leg of the American Triple Crown, followed by the Preakness Stakes, and then the Belmont Stakes. Of the three Triple Crown races, the Kentucky Derby has the distinction of having been run uninterrupted since its inaugural race in 1875. The race was rescheduled to September 2020 due to the COVID-19 pandemic. The Preakness and Belmont Stakes races had taken hiatuses in 1891–1893 and 1911–1912, respectively. Even with the Olympics and major professional sports leagues canceled at those points, the Derby, Preakness, and Belmont took place during the Great Depression and both World Wars.

A horse must win all three races to win the Triple Crown. In the 2015 listing of the International Federation of Horseracing Authorities (IFHA), the Kentucky Derby tied with the Whitney Handicap as the top Grade 1 race in the United States outside the Breeders' Cup races.

The attendance at the Kentucky Derby ranks first in North America and usually surpasses the attendance numbers of all other stakes races including the Preakness Stakes, Belmont Stakes, and the Breeders' Cup.

149th Running of the Kentucky Derby will be held on Saturday, May 6, 2023.

History
In 1872, Col. Meriwether Lewis Clark Jr., grandson of William Clark of the Lewis and Clark expedition, traveled to England, visiting Epsom in Surrey where The Derby had been running annually since 1780. From there, Clark went on to Paris, France, where a group of racing enthusiasts had formed the French Jockey Club in 1863. They had organized the Grand Prix de Paris at Longchamp, which at the time was the greatest race in France. Returning home to Kentucky, Clark organized the Louisville Jockey Club to raise money for building quality racing facilities just outside the city. The track would soon become known as Churchill Downs, named for John and Henry Churchill, who provided the land for the racetrack. The naming went official in 1937.

The Kentucky Derby was first run at  miles (12 furlongs; 2.4 km) the same distance as the Epsom Derby, before changing lengths in 1896 to its current  miles (10 furlongs; 2 km). On May 17, 1875, in front of an estimated crowd of 10,000 people, a field of 15 three-year-old horses contested the first Derby. Under jockey Oliver Lewis, a colt named Aristides, who was trained by future Hall of Famer Ansel Williamson, won the inaugural Derby. Later that year, Lewis rode Aristides to a second-place finish in the Belmont Stakes.

Initially a successful venue, the track ran into financial difficulties due to a protracted, gambling-related horseman boycott removing it from the upper echelons of racing that would last until the Winn era (see below). In 1894 the New Louisville Jockey Club was incorporated with the new capitalization and improved facilities. Despite this, the business floundered until 1902, when a syndicate led by Col. Matt Winn of Louisville acquired the facility. Under Winn, Churchill Downs prospered, and the Kentucky Derby then became the preeminent stakes race for three-year-old thoroughbred horses in North America.

Thoroughbred owners began sending their successful Derby horses to compete in two other races. These two are the Preakness Stakes at the Pimlico Race Course, in Baltimore, and the Belmont Stakes in Elmont, New York. The three races offered large purses, and in 1919 Sir Barton became the first horse to win all three races. However, the term Triple Crown didn't come into use for another eleven years. In 1930, when Gallant Fox became the second horse to win all three races, sportswriter Charles Hatton brought the phrase into American usage. Fueled by the media, public interest in the possibility of a "superhorse" that could win the Triple Crown began in the weeks leading up to the Derby. Two years after the term went in use, the race (until that time ran in mid-May since inception) changed the date to the first Saturday in May. This change allows for a specific schedule for the Triple Crown races. Since 1931, the order of Triple Crown races has been the Kentucky Derby first, followed by the Preakness Stakes and then the Belmont Stakes. Before 1931, eleven times the Preakness was run before the Derby. On May 12, 1917, and again on May 13, 1922, the Preakness and the Derby took place on the same day. On eleven occasions the Belmont Stakes was run before the Preakness Stakes, and in 2020, the Belmont was run first, then the Kentucky Derby, and the Preakness Stakes last.

On May 16, 1925, the first live radio broadcast of the Kentucky Derby aired on WHAS as well as on WGN in Chicago. On May 7, 1949, the first television coverage of the Kentucky Derby took place, produced by WAVE-TV, the NBC affiliate in Louisville. This coverage was aired live in the Louisville market and sent to NBC as a kinescope newsreel recording for national broadcast. On May 3, 1952, the first national television coverage of the Kentucky Derby took place, aired from then-CBS affiliate WHAS-TV. In 1954, the purse exceeded US$100,000 for the first time. In 1968, Dancer's Image became the first horse to win the race and then face disqualification. A urine test revealed traces of phenylbutazone (an anti-inflammatory painkiller drug) inside Dancer's Image. Forward Pass won after a protracted legal battle by the owners of Dancer's Image (which they lost). Forward Pass thus became the eighth winner for Calumet Farm. Unexpectedly, the regulations at Kentucky thoroughbred race tracks were changed some years later, allowing horses to run on phenylbutazone. In 1970, Diane Crump became the first female jockey to ride in the Derby, finishing 15th aboard Fathom.

The fastest time ever run in the Derby was in 1973 at 1:59.4 minutes, when Secretariat broke the record set by Northern Dancer in 1964. Also during that race, Secretariat did something unique in Triple Crown races: for each successive quarter run, his times were faster. Although the races do not record times for non-winners, in 1973 Sham finished second, two and a half lengths behind Secretariat in the same race. Using the thoroughbred racing convention of one length equaling one-fifth of a second to calculate Sham's time, he also finished in under two minutes. Another sub-two-minute finish, only the third, was set in 2001 by Monarchos at 1:59.97, the first year the race used hundredths of seconds instead of fifths in timing.

In 2005, the purse distribution for the Derby changed, so that horses finishing fifth would henceforth receive a share of the purse; previously only the first four finishers did so.

The Kentucky Derby began offering $3 million in purse money in 2019. Churchill Downs officials have cited the success of historical race wagering terminals at their Derby City Gaming facility in Louisville as a factor behind the purse increase. The Derby first offered a $1 million purse in 1996; it was doubled to $2 million in 2005.

In 2020, The Kentucky Derby was postponed from May 2 to September 5 due to the COVID-19 pandemic. This was the second time in history the race had been postponed, the other being in 1945. Churchill Downs used a new singular 20-stall starting gate for the 2020 Kentucky Derby, replacing the previous arrangement that used a standard 14-stall gate and an auxiliary six-stall gate. The old setup contributed to congestion at the start of the race, especially in the gap between the two gates.

The Kentucky Derby is the oldest continuously held major sporting event in the United States (1875).

Attendance 
Millions of people from around the world bet at various live tracks and online sportsbooks. In 2017, a crowd of 158,070 watched Always Dreaming win the Derby, making it the seventh biggest attendance in the history of the racetrack. The track reported a wagering total of $209.2 million from all the sources on all the races on the Kentucky Derby Day program. It was a 9 percent increase compared to the total of $192.6 million in 2016 and an increase of 8 percent over the previous record set in 2015 of $194.3 million. TwinSpires, a platform for betting online and a partner of the Kentucky Derby and the Breeders' Cup, recorded $32.8 million in handle on the Churchill Down races for the Kentucky Derby Day program. This record was a 22 percent increase over the preceding year. On the Kentucky Derby race alone, the handle of TwinSpires was $20.1 million, which is a 22 percent rise compared to the prior year.

The race often draws celebrities. HM Queen Elizabeth II, on a visit to the United States, joined the racegoers at Churchill Downs in 2007.

Sponsorship 
The 2004 Kentucky Derby marked the first time that jockeys —as a result of a court order— were allowed to wear corporate advertising logos on their clothing.

Norman Adams has been the designer of the Kentucky Derby Logo since 2002. On February 1, 2006, the Louisville-based fast-food company Yum! Brands, Inc. announced a corporate sponsorship deal to call the race "The Kentucky Derby presented by Yum! Brands."  In 2018 Woodford Reserve replaced Yum! Brands as the presenting sponsor.

Traditions
In addition to the race itself, several traditions play a significant role in the Derby atmosphere. The mint julep—an iced drink consisting of bourbon, mint, and sugar syrup—is the traditional beverage of the race. The historic beverage comes served in an ice-frosted silver julep cup. However, most Churchill Downs patrons sip theirs from souvenir glasses (first offered in 1939 and available in revised form each year since) printed with all previous Derby winners. Also, burgoo, a thick stew of beef, chicken, pork, and vegetables, is a popular Kentucky dish served at the Derby.

The infield—a spectator area inside the track—offers general admission prices but little chance of seeing much of the race, particularly before the jumbotron installation in 2014. Instead, revelers show up in the infield to party with abandon. By contrast, "Millionaire's Row" refers to the expensive box seats that attract the rich, the famous and the well-connected. Women appear in elegant outfits lavishly accessorized with large, elaborate hats. Following the Call to the Post, as the horses start to parade before the grandstands, the University of Louisville Cardinal Marching Band plays Stephen Foster's "My Old Kentucky Home". This song is a tradition which began in 1921. The event attracts spectators from a large area, flying in hundreds of private aircraft to Louisville International Airport.

The Derby is frequently referred to as "The Run for the Roses", because a lush blanket of 554 red roses is awarded to the Kentucky Derby winner each year. The tradition originated in 1883 when New York City socialite E. Berry Wall presented roses to ladies at a post-Derby party. The Churchill Downs founder and president, Col. M. Lewis Clark, attended that event. This gesture is believed to have led Clark to the idea of making the rose the race's official flower. However, it was not until 1896 that any recorded account referred to draping roses on the Derby winner. The Governor of Kentucky presents the garland and the Kentucky Derby Trophy to the winner. Pop vocalist Dan Fogelberg composed the song "Run for the Roses", released in time for the 1980 running of the race.

Riders Up! 
"Riders Up!" is the traditional command from the Paddock Judge for jockeys to mount their horses in advance of the upcoming race. Since 2012, a dignitary or celebrity attendee recites this phrase.

Festival 

In the weeks preceding the race, numerous activities took place for the Kentucky Derby Festival. Thunder Over Louisville—an airshow and fireworks display—generally begins the festivities in earnest two weeks before the Derby.

Derby Galas 

A number of galas are held to celebrate the Kentucky Derby leading up to Derby day itself including one of the oldest, ongoing galas called Barnstable Brown.  Funds raised at Barnstable Brown support the Barnstable Brown Diabetes Center at the University of Kentucky.
.

Records
Speed record:
 Mile and a Quarter: 1:59.4 – Secretariat (1973)
 Mile and a Half: 2:34.5 – Spokane (1889)

Margin of Victory:
 8 lengths – Old Rosebud (1914), Johnstown (1939), Whirlaway (1941), Assault (1946)

Most wins by a jockey:
 5 – Eddie Arcaro (1938, 1941, 1945, 1948, 1952)
 5 – Bill Hartack (1957, 1960, 1962, 1964, 1969)

Most wins by a trainer:
 6 – Bob Baffert (1997, 1998, 2002, 2015, 2018, 2020)
 6 – Ben A. Jones (1938, 1941, 1944, 1948, 1949, 1952)

Most wins by an owner:
 8 – Calumet Farm (1941, 1944, 1948, 1949, 1952, 1957, 1958, 1968)

Longest shots to win the Derby:
 91 to 1 – Donerail (1913)
 80 to 1 – Rich Strike (2022)

Miscellaneous:
 In 2010, Calvin Borel set a new record, being the first jockey to win 3 out of 4 consecutive Kentucky Derbys.
 In 2018, Justify became the first horse since Apollo in 1882 to win the Derby without having raced as a two-year-old.

Winners

Triple Crown winners are in bold.

Notes
 designates a filly.

Sire lines
 the Darley Arabian (1700c) sire line (all branched through the Eclipse (1764) line) produced 130 Derby winners (122 colts, 5 geldings, 3 fillies), including all winners from 1938 to present. The main branches of this sire line are:
 the King Fergus (1775) branch (all branched through the Voltigeur (1847) line), produced 14 winners. His sire line continued primarily through his son Vedette (1854) with 12 winners, due to his sons Speculum (1865) with 6 winners (nearly exclusively through Sundridge (1898) with 5 winners, most recently Count Turf in 1951) and Galopin (1872) with 6 winners (exclusively through St. Simon (1881), most recently Go For Gin in 1994).
 the Potoooooooo (1773) branch produced 116 winners (all branched through the Waxy (1790) line), including all winners from 1995 to present. The primary branch of this sire line is through Whalebone (1807), which has produced 111 winners. In turn, the primary branch continues through Sir Hercules (1826), which has produced 89 winners (including all winners since 2006), and then the Birdcatcher (1833) branch which produced 77 winners. From Birdcatcher, the branch of The Baron (1842) has produced 67 winners, of which 65 winners trace to Stockwell (1849). Stockwell's son Doncaster (1870) sired Bend Or (1877), whose sire line accounts for 63 winners. The main branch of the Bend Or sire line continued through his son Bona Vista (1889) with 54 winners, exclusively through the Phalaris (1913) line, which has dominated in the last several decades (including all winners from 2006 to present) through the following sons:  
the Pharamond (1925) branch (4 winners all through the Tom Fool (1949) line, most recently Silver Charm in 1997); 
the Sickle (1924) branch (23 winners all branched through the Native Dancer (1950) line, nearly exclusively through Raise a Native (1961) with 22 winners, continued primarily through Mr Prospector (1970) with 15 winners (through 8 different sons: Fusaichi Pegasus, winner of the 2000 Kentucky Derby, and 7 other sons through their progeny (most recently Rich Strike in 2022), with his son Fappiano (1977) accounting for 6 winners (most recently Always Dreaming in 2017)); 
the Pharos (1920) branch (27 winners all branched through the Nearco (1935) line, through his sons Royal Charger (1942), Nearctic (1954), and Nasrullah (1940)). The Royal Charger branch produced 5 winners (most recently Barbaro in 2006), the Nearctic branch produced 8 winners, exclusively through his son Northern Dancer (1961) with his win in the 1964 Kentucky Derby, and direct male progeny of 7 winners (most recently Mandaloun in 2021), while the Nasrullah branch produced 14 winners (most recently Nyquist in 2016) primarily due to his son Bold Ruler (1954) with 10 winners (most recently California Chrome in 2014).
 Special notes:
 The Waxy (1790) branch produced two main lines: the primary branch of Whalebone (1807), and the secondary branch of Whisker (1812) which produced 5 winners (exclusively through the King Tom (1851) line), most recently 1909 Kentucky Derby winner Wintergreen.
 An offshoot of the Whalebone (1807) branch, the Camel (1822) branch (18 winners exclusively through the Touchstone (1831) line), produced 2005 Kentucky Derby winner Giacomo through his grandson Orlando's (1841) branch. Since then, each winner of the Kentucky Derby has gone through Whalebone's more frequent sire line branch of Sir Herecules (1826). The Orlando branch (6 winners exclusively through the Himyar (1875) line) is the less common of the two branches derived through Camel. Orlando's brother Newminster (1848) produced 12 winners (primarily through the Hyperion (1930) line with 8 winners), most recently Chateaugay in 1963.
 The Sir Hercules (1826) branch produced two main lines: the primary branch of Birdcatcher (1833), and the secondary branch of Faugh-a-Ballagh (1841) which produced 12 winners (exclusively through the Leamington (1853) line), most recently 1908 Kentucky Derby winner Stone Street.
 The Birdcatcher (1833) branch produced two main lines: the primary branch of The Baron (1842), and the secondary branch of Oxford (1857) which produced 10 winners (primarily through the Swynford (1907) line with 8 winners), most recently 1965 Kentucky Derby winner Lucky Debonair.
 The Bend Or (1877) branch produced two main lines: the primary branch of Bona Vista (1889), and the secondary branch of Ormonde (1883) which produced 8 winners (exclusively through the Teddy (1913) line), most recently 1957 Kentucky Derby winner Iron Liege.
 the Byerley Turk (1680c) sire line produced 11 winners (8 colts, 3 geldings). The main branches of this sire (all branched through the Herod (1758) line) are:
 the Highflyer (1774) branch produced 1 winner, most recently Macbeth II in 1888
 the Florizel (1768) branch produced 3 winners (all branched through the Lexington (1850) line), most recently Manuel in 1899
 the Woodpecker (1773) branch produced 7 winners (all branched through the Buzzard (1787) line). The main branches of this sire line are:
the Castrel (1801) branch produced 1 winner, most recently Kingman in 1891
the Selim (1802) branch produced 6 winners (all branched through the Glencoe (1831) line). The main branches of this sire line are:
the Star Davis (1849) branch produced 1 winner, most recently Day Star in 1878
the Vandal (1850) branch produced 5 winners (all branched through the Virgil (1864) line), most recently Alan-a-Dale in 1902
 the Godolphin Arabian (1724c) sire line produced 7 winners (6 colts, 1 gelding). The main branches of this sire (all branched through the West Australian (1850) line) are:
 the Solon (1861) branch produced 3 winners, including:
the Barcaldine (1878) branch produced 1 winner, most recently Omar Khayyam in 1917
the Arbitrator (1874) branch produced 2 winners (all branched through The Finn (1912) line), most recently Flying Ebony in 1925
 the Australian (1858) branch produced 4 winners, including:
 Baden-Baden (1874), winner of the 1877 Kentucky Derby
the Waverly (1870) branch produced 1 winner, most recently Montrose in 1887
the Spendthrift (1876) branch produced 2 winners (all branched through the Man o' War (1917) line), most recently War Admiral in 1937

Kentucky Derby winners with male-line descendants including other Kentucky Derby winners
 Northern Dancer (1964 winner) – 7 colts; most recently Mandaloun (2021)
 Ben Brush (1896 winner) - 3 winners (2 colts, 1 filly); most recently Whiskery (1927)
 Seattle Slew (1977 winner) – 3 colts; most recently California Chrome (2014)
 Unbridled (1990 winner) – 3 winners (2 colts, 1 gelding); most recently American Pharoah (2015)
 Hindoo (1881 winner) – 2 colts; most recently Alan-a-Dale (1902)
 Bold Venture (1936 winner) – 2 colts; most recently Middleground (1950)
 Reigh Count (1928 winner) – 2 colts; most recently Count Turf (1951)
 Pensive (1944 winner) – 2 colts; most recently Needles (1956)
 Majestic Prince (1969 winner) – 2 colts; most recently Super Saver (2010)
 Halma (1895 winner) – 1 colt; Alan-a-Dale (1902)
 Leonatus (1883 winner) – 1 colt; Pink Star (1907)
 Bubbling Over (1926 winner) – 1 colt; Burgoo King (1932)
 Gallant Fox (1930 winner) – 1 colt; Omaha (1935)
 Count Fleet (1943 winner) – 1 colt; Count Turf (1951)
 Ponder (1949 winner) – 1 colt; Needles (1956)
 Determine (1954 winner) – 1 colt; Decidedly (1962)
 Swaps (1955 winner) – 1 colt; Chateaugay (1963)
 Grindstone (1996 winner) – 1 gelding; Mine That Bird (2009)

See also

 Kentucky Oaks
 Kentucky Derby Festival
 American thoroughbred racing top attended events
 Kentucky Derby top four finishers
 List of graded stakes at Churchill Downs
 "The Kentucky Derby Is Decadent and Depraved", a seminal example of New Journalism by Hunter S. Thompson
 Triple Crown Productions
 Triple Crown of Thoroughbred Racing
 Grand Slam of Thoroughbred Racing
 List of attractions and events in the Louisville metropolitan area
 Derby Pie
 List of Kentucky Derby broadcasters

References

Further reading
 David Domine, Insiders' Guide to Louisville. Guilford, Connecticut: Globe-Pequot Press, 2010.
 James C. Nicholson, The Kentucky Derby: How the Run for the Roses Became America's Premier Sporting Event. Lexington, Kentucky: University Press of Kentucky, 2012.

External links

 
 Kentucky Derby Museum
 The Courier-Journals Derby Site
 History of the Kentucky Derby
 ESPN.com – attending the Kentucky Derby
 Kentucky Derby News

 
1875 establishments in Kentucky
Annual sporting events in the United States
Churchill Downs horse races
Flat horse races for three-year-olds
Grade 1 stakes races in the United States
Graded stakes races in the United States
Kentucky culture
May sporting events
Recurring sporting events established in 1875
Sports competitions in Louisville, Kentucky
Triple Crown of Thoroughbred Racing